The word destabilisation can be applied to a wide variety of contexts such as attempts to undermine political, military or economic power.

Psychology 
In a psychological context it is used as a technique in brainwashing and abuse to disorient and disarm the victim. 

In the context of workplace bullying, destabilisation applied to the victim may involve: 

 failure to acknowledge good work and value the victim's efforts
 allocation of meaningless tasks 
 removal of areas of responsibility without consultation 
 repeated reminders of blunders 
 setting up to fail
 shifting of goal posts without telling the victim
 persistent attempts to demoralise the victim

Destabilisation could also denote the extreme end of disinhibition syndrome and entail the complete shutdown of an individual's control of emotions, inhibitions, and productive functioning. The condition can be episodic or it could last for months or years, requiring professional care from a practitioner who is familiar with the individual's primary neurological disorder.

In psychology, there is also a process called cognitive destabilisation, which involves being open to conversions and transformations of various kinds. This could be used to counter political destabilisation by presenting a consensual view of the problem.

Other applications 
Destabilisation is also used in the feminist context such as the way it is used to change the binary opposition between men and women, particularly how it gives the category 'woman' its meaning. For instance, this is expressed in many feminists' discomfort concerning postmodern theories' challenge to traditional binary oppositions, perceiving it as a subversion of women's attempt to define their own subjecthood. The body of literature on feminism also often invoke the need to destabilise modern theory, particularly the theoretical discourses that claim neutrality but are established from a masculine perspective. These attempts to destabilise modern female constructs have been informed by Jacques Derrida's deconstruction theory, particularly the destabilisation of positions and subjects that have been deemed holistic or authoritative.

In literature, a conceptualization refers to it as an aggression or a kind of attack on the reader to provoke discomfort. In international capital transactions, it is used to denote as a capital movement driven by erroneous forecast, driving the exchange rate away from equilibrium that would be supported by rational speculators whose foresight are correct.

See also

References

Further reading
 
 
 
 
 
 

Deception
Mind control
Psychological abuse
Bullying
Workplace bullying